Saguday, officially the Municipality of Saguday, is a 5th class municipality in the province of Quirino, Philippines. According to the 2020 census, it has a population of 17,137 people.

Etymology
The naming of Saguday has no legendary story or folktale. It was named by Mr. Jose Cardenas of San Jose, Nueva Ecija, the grandfather of former Mayor Leandro G. Cardenas who came to visit his kins in Saguday. The word Saguday is an Ilocano term which connotes that one possesses good traits and blessed with clean mind, heart and soul.

History
Among the most memorable event in the chronicle of Saguday is June 21, 1959, the founding of this town as a regular municipality of then Province of Nueva Vizcaya by virtue of House Bill No. 2541, authored by Leonardo B. Perez, then Congressman of the Lone District of Nueva Vizcaya which pursuant to the provisions of Article VI, Section 20 (1) of the Philippine Constitution, became a law without the signature of President Carlos P. Garcia, entitled Republic Act No. 2519. Pursuant to Section 1 of this law, the seven barrios composing the Municipality of Saguday are
as follows: La Paz, Saguday (now Rizal and Magsaysay), Salvacion, Santo Tomas which were separated from the Municipality of Diffun; while Dibul, Mangandingay and Tres Reyes were separated from the
Municipality of Aglipay.

Originally, Saguday was a barrio of the Municipality of Santiago, Isabela, however, upon the final settlement of the boundary dispute between Isabela and Nueva Vizcaya, Saguday became a regular barrio of Diffun by virtue of an Executive Order No. 386, issued by then President Elpidio Quirino.

The first settlers of Saguday were spearheaded by the adventurous and hardworking Ilocanos composed of the families of Corpuz, Cortez, Cabiles, Guzman and Bacani who hailed from the Province of Pangasinan, the Pagbilao and Olonan family from Ilocos Region, and the families of Cardenas, and Tomas from the Province of Nueva Ecija, who all came to exploit the vast virgin lands and forest of this very promising valley.

On August 16, 1959, the founding set of Local Officials to govern the Local Government Unit appointed by then President of the Republic of the Philippines Carlos P. Garcia have assumed office, with then Luis C. Lucas, Sr. as the Municipal Mayor, while the late Nicanor Pagbilao as the Municipal Vice Mayor.

Saguday was born as a sixth class municipality composing of seven (7) barrios, however, in the year 1980 and 1981, two (2) additional barangays were created. Barangay Cardenas was created in 1980
pursuant to Sangguniang Bayan Resolution No. 02, series of 1980, while Barangay Gamis was founded in 1981, pursuant to Resolution No. 05, Series of 1981. At present, Saguday is still a 5th Class Municipality due to its limited income which is attributed to scarce resources.

Upon the creation of the Municipality of Saguday, the urban core was divided into two barrios : District I now Barangay Magsaysay has been the seat of the Municipal Government from then up to present, and District II now Barangay Rizal.

Vision
Saguday will be a prime agro-industrial and residential investment destination in the province nurtured by God-loving, informed, empowered, and healthy citizens who live in a competitive and sustainable economy in a peaceful and pro-active community under a transparent, accountable and ethical governance.

Mission
To promote, uplift and transform the way of life of the people towards a competitive and sustainable economy through a good organizational climate, culture of change, and the delivery of accessible, comprehensive and quality services by means of a transparent, accountable and ethical governance.

Geography

Barangays
Saguday is politically subdivided into 9 barangays. These barangays are headed by elected officials: Barangay Captain, Barangay Council, whose members are called Barangay Councilors. All are elected every three years.

 Cardenas
 Dibul
 Gamis
 La Paz
 Magsaysay (Poblacion)
 Rizal (Poblacion)
 Salvacion
 Santo Tomas
 Tres Reyes

Climate

Demographics

Economy

Government
Saguday, belonging to the lone congressional district of the province of Quirino, is governed by a mayor designated as its local chief executive and by a municipal council as its legislative body in accordance with the Local Government Code. The mayor, vice mayor, and the councilors are elected directly by the people through an election which is being held every three years.

Elected officials

Education
The Schools Division of Quirino governs the town's public education system. The division office is a field office of the DepEd in Cagayan Valley region. The office governs the public and private elementary and public and private high schools throughout the municipality.

References

External links
Saguday Profile at PhilAtlas.com
[ Philippine Standard Geographic Code]
Philippine Census Information
Local Governance Performance Management System

Municipalities of Quirino